Phyllogaster is a fungal genus in the family Agaricaceae. This is a monotypic genus, containing the single species Phyllogaster pholiotoides, found in Ghana and described as new to science in 1969.

See also
 List of Agaricaceae genera
 List of Agaricales genera

References

Agaricaceae
Fungi of Africa
Monotypic Agaricales genera